The UEFA Women's U-19 Championship 2004 Final Tournament was held in Finland between 28 July – 8 August 2004. Players born after 1 January 1985 were eligible to participate in this competition. Spain won the cup after defeating Germany 2–1 in the final match.

Final tournament

Group stage

Group A

Group B

Knockout stage

Semifinals

Final

Awards

Goalscorers
6 goals
  Anja Mittag

4 goals
  Annike Krahn
  Simone Laudehr

3 goals

  Lena Goessling
  Katharina Griessemer
  Serena Coppolino
  Jade Boho
  Iraia Iturregui

2 goals

  Emilie L'huillier
  Penelope Riboldi
  Agnese Ricco
  Elena Terekhova
  Miriam Diéguez
  Irune Murua

1 goal

  Taru Laihanen
  Elise Bussaglia
  Gwenaelle Pele
  Melanie Behringer
  Susanne Kasperczyk
  Karolin Thomas
  Anneli Giske
  Tone Røst Heimlund
  Elena Danilova
  Svetlana Tsydikova
  Vanessa Bürki
  Lara Dickenmann

own goals
  Nora Holstad Berge (playing against Russia)
  Ane Bergara Artieda (playing against Switzerland)
  Ana Belen Aguillera Caballero (playing against Germany)

External links
Official website

2004
Women
UEFA
2004
2004 in Finnish football
2004–05 in German women's football
2004–05 in Spanish women's football
2004–05 in Swiss football
2004–05 in Italian women's football
2004–05 in French women's football
2004 in Russian football
2004 in Norwegian women's football
July 2004 sports events in Europe
August 2004 sports events in Europe
2004 in youth association football